This article refers to the short novel by Jack Kerouac. For the Smashing Pumpkins song, see Tristessa (song)

Tristessa is a novella by Beat Generation writer Jack Kerouac set in Mexico City. It is based on his relationship with a Mexican prostitute (the title character). The woman's real name was Esperanza ("hope" in Spanish); Kerouac changed her name to Tristessa ("tristeza" means sadness in Spanish and Portuguese).

This novel has been translated into Spanish by Jorge García-Robles of Mexico City.

Summary 
Allen Ginsberg, in describing the book, wrote  "Tristessa's a narrative meditation studying a hen, a rooster, a dove, a cat, a dog, family meat, and a ravishing, ravished junkie lady". In Tristessa, Kerouac attempts to sketch for the reader a picture of quiet transcendence in hectic and sometimes dangerous circumstances. He chronicles Tristessa's addiction to morphine and impoverished life with descriptions tinged with elements of her saintly beauty and her innocence.

Early in the novel, Kerouac attempts to communicate his Buddhist beliefs. These beliefs become entangled as a metaphor in the unfamiliar culture and language that Kerouac tries to grasp and make contact with in the story.

The self-destructive nature of her addiction contrast with the beauty of Kerouac's descriptions. Also, as a part of the study of the life of a junkie, is the character of Old Bull Gaines - Bill Garver, in real life, a long-time friend of William S. Burroughs and other writers of the Beat Generation - who serves as both dealer and healer of Tristessa when Jack is unable to be what she needs.

References

1960 American novels
Novels by Jack Kerouac
Fictional prostitutes
American novellas
Novels set in Mexico City
Novels about prostitution
Works about prostitution in Mexico